The 2014 Royal London One-Day Cup tournament was the 2014 season ECB limited overs cricket competition for the England and Wales first-class counties. It replaced the ECB 40 tournament that ran from 2010 to 2013. The number of overs per innings was increased to 50 to bring the competition in line with One Day Internationals. Unlike in the previous competition, the national teams of Scotland, the Netherlands and the Unicorns cricket team (a team formed of players who do not have first-class contracts) did not participate in the competition.

The competition consisted of two groups of nine teams, from which the top four teams from each group progressed to the quarter-finals. The groups were allocated randomly.

Durham County Cricket Club won the tournament, defeating Warwickshire County Cricket Club by three wickets in the final at Lord's on 20 September 2014. This was Durham's second limited overs title in first-class cricket after the 2007 Friends Provident Trophy.

Competition format

Group stage

Group A

Table

Fixtures

Group B

Table

Fixtures

Knockout stage

Quarter-finals

Semi-finals

Final

See also
ECB 40
2014 NatWest t20 Blast

References

External links
Official Site
Tournament Site - Cricinfo

2014 in English cricket
2014 in cricket
Royal London One-Day Cup
Royal London One-Day Cup